The Queen in Australia is a 1954 documentary about the visit of Queen Elizabeth II to Australia in 1954. It was the first colour film made in Australia.

It was released in the US by the Australian government information service.

References

External links
The Queen in Australia at A Place to Think:ABC – contains a copy of the film

The Queen in Australia at National Film and Sound Archive
The Queen in Australia at Oz Movies
The Queen in Australia at Australian Screen Online
Article on making of The Queen in Australia at National Film and Sound Archive

1954 films
Australian documentary films
Documentary films about British royalty
Films about Elizabeth II
Australia–United Kingdom relations
Royal visits to Australia
Films directed by Stanley Hawes
Documentary films about Australia
1950s English-language films
1954 documentary films